Smith Metropolitan AME Zion Church is a historic African Methodist Episcopal Zion Church located at Smith and Cottage Streets in Poughkeepsie, Dutchess County, New York.  It is the oldest predominantly African-American church in Dutchess County, NY. The church was a part of The Underground Railroad led by Civil Rights leader Harriet Tubman.  The first black female judge in America, Ms. Jane Bolin, was a member of this church, along with other influential people. The church has experienced phenomenal new growth under the leadership of their Pastor, Reverend Edwrin Sutton. The Church as a ministry began in 1836. The church building was built between 1908 and 1910, with the parsonage added in 1914.  The one-story, rectangular Gothic Revival church has an attached two-story bell tower topped by a pyramidal roof and a raised basement.  The brick building features pointed arched openings and stained glass windows.

It was added to the National Register of Historic Places in 1991.

References

African Methodist Episcopal churches in New York (state)
Churches on the National Register of Historic Places in New York (state)
Gothic Revival church buildings in New York (state)
Churches completed in 1910
Churches in Dutchess County, New York
Houses in Dutchess County, New York
National Register of Historic Places in Poughkeepsie, New York